The Transfiguration (Ratnaya) Church ― one of the architectural landmarks of the stanitsa of Starocherkasskaya, Rostov Oblast, Russia. It is the first stone church in Starocherkassk ever built. This church was also the second oldest temple in the stanitsa. It was constructed on the site of the burnt wooden Church of St. Elijah by the same Moscow masters that built the bell tower of the Resurrection Cathedral.

History 
The Transfiguration Church is situated next to military cemetery that was established in 17th-20th centuries. The second name of the church ― Ratnaya, is linked to Ratny tract, which had long been a place of Cossack armies' assemble. According to historical sources it is known that in 1673 in the hills just north to Cherkassk there was built a town with a population of about 6,000 people. The reason for establishment of the settlement was the alliance of Don Cossacks and Russia in their fight against the Turks in Azov. Ratnaya Church, dedicated to St. Elijah was built in 1701. The completion is specified in a petition of the Don Cossacks to Tsar Peter I, in which the Cossacks requested some priests to be sent. Local archives point out that the church was made of wood as of 1718. Since 1735 the church is marked in Cherkassk maps. By decree of Elizabeth I on May 31, 1744 in Cherkassk began the construction of a stone church. The bell tower was built in 1751. During the construction there was brought 3276 kg of copper and tin for the production of bells. The church according to some sources, burnt down on August 12, 1744. In 1748 was another fire, and by 1781 the church was restored.

Gallery

References

Sources 
 Забазнов Ю. С. История создания и реконструкции Воскресенского собора в Старочеркасске 'Дон' — Ростов-на-Дону, 1979
 В. И. Кулишов. В низовьях Дона. Москва 'Искусство'. 1987.

Churches in Rostov Oblast
Cultural heritage monuments of federal significance in Rostov Oblast